

Wulfred (died ) was a medieval Bishop of Lichfield.

Wulfred was consecrated either between 869 and 883 or 875 and 883 and died between 889 and 900.

Citations

References

External links
 

9th-century English bishops
Anglo-Saxon bishops of Lichfield
895 deaths
Year of birth unknown